Valg Sar (also known as Valkeh Sar) is a village located in Goli Jan Rural District, in the Central District of Tonekabon County, Mazandaran Province, Iran. At the 2006 census, its population was 32, in 23 families.

References 

Populated places in Tonekabon County